Card Player magazine is an industry publication and web portal specializing in poker media, poker strategy and poker tournament coverage. The magazine is headquartered in Las Vegas, Nevada.

History and profile
The magazine was founded in 1988 by June Field. In 1998 it was bought by Barry Shulman, who is the current publisher and CEO.  Jeff Shulman is the president.

The publication's umbrella company, Card Player Media, LLC, also publishes Card Player Europe. The magazines have a combined monthly circulation of approximately 300,000.

Card Player releases a new issue every two weeks.  An issue typically consists of feature articles, tournament reports, and columns.  Feature articles are usually in-depth profiles of prominent players on the tournament circuit.  Tournament reports are on-location reports of the richest and most prestigious poker tournaments.  Each issue also has a large number of strategy columns, coming from a stable of acclaimed poker players and authors which includes three former world champions.

Card Player Media has content licensing agreements with media partners CardPlayer Bulgaria (magazine and website), Card Player Polska (Poland), Card Player Italia (Italy), Pokerilehti (Finland & Estonia), Poker (Card Player France), CardPlayer Deutsch (Germany), Poker Magazine (Sweden), CardPlayer.fi (Finland website), CardPlayer South Africa (South Africa), CardPlayer Espana (Spain), CardPlayer Brasil (Brazil) and CardPlayer Latin America, which publishes CardPlayer Argentina+Uruguay.

SpadeClub
In 2008, Card Player Media launched SpadeClub.com, an online poker website.  Members of SpadeClub paid a monthly subscription fee to enter into a variety of free poker tournaments.  Spadeclub ceased operations and migrated all users into Zen Gaming in September 2010.

Player of the Year Award
Card Player is also well known for its Player of the Year Award. Started in 1997, it goes to the player who has the most outstanding tournament results throughout the year.  Players are awarded points for final-table finishes in major tournaments.  Points that can be earned in a given tournament are adjusted based on the buy-in, as well as the number of entrants.  The player who accumulates the most points by the end of the year receives the award.

Notes

External links

CardPlayerLA.com - Latinoamérica

Monthly magazines published in the United States
Magazines established in 1988
Poker publications
Professional and trade magazines
Magazines published in Nevada
Mass media in Las Vegas